Cape Reichelderfer is a rounded, mainly ice-covered headland 4 nautical miles (7 km) east of DeBusk Scarp, lying at the west side of Stefansson Strait on the east coast of Palmer Land. This cape was seen by Sir Hubert Wilkins who explored this coast on his aerial flight of December 20, 1928. It was charted in 1940 by the United States Antarctic Service (USAS) and erroneously called Cape Rymill at that time. Resighted in 1947 by the Ronne Antarctic Research Expedition (RARE) under Ronne who named it for Francis W. Reichelderfer, Chief of the U.S. Weather Bureau.
 

Headlands of Palmer Land